Sögeln is a village in Lower Saxony, Germany. Since 1972, it has been a part of the city of Bramsche. The village developed around a castle from the 14th century.

References

Villages in Lower Saxony